Cloo (stylized as cloo) was an American pay television channel owned and operated by NBCUniversal which aired programming originally dedicated to the crime and mystery genres, though it often fell out of this format in its later years with a more generic selection of series and films, and was used as an example of channel drift and superfluous channel bundling, presenting series easily found through other venues.

, approximately 25,495,000 American households (21.9% of households with television) received Cloo, though this declined with later removals by several cable services as carriage agreements expired.

Cloo launched on January 1, 2006, as Sleuth, replacing Trio. The channel closed on February 1, 2017.

History

Cloo focused on mystery entertainment, with the majority of the channel's programming sourced from fellow Comcast networks such as NBC and USA Network. As of the fall of 2016 the network's schedule was made up mostly of repeats of current USA Network series, and marathons of acquired series from the Law and Order, NCIS and CSI franchises, along with the original MacGyver and House. Films from the NBCUniversal library or acquired as part of USA Network's film rights purchases were also part of the schedule, meaning films having nothing to do with crimes or mysteries, such as Enchanted, The 40 Year-Old Virgin and Bee Movie aired on the network.

On August 15, 2011 Cloo was rebranded from its former name of Sleuth, in order for NBCU to be able to trademark and own the name, as the word "clue" itself is too common a name to be trademark-able and the commonness of both "sleuth" and "clue" would not work for search engine optimization. In addition, the different spelling averted any confusion with Hasbro's board game Clue.

Carriage decline and closure
On August 10, 2013, Cloo was dropped by Dish Network, which cited that most of the network's rerun-centric programming was duplicative of that available on other networks and streaming services. A year later on August 18, 2014, it was removed from Verizon FIOS for the same reason.

Charter Communications (Spectrum, Bright House Networks and Time Warner Cable) effectively ended the network's life in January 2017, as with Esquire Network (another Comcast/NBCU network which was discontinued on June 28, 2017), when it refused to continue their carriage of Cloo within their new carriage agreements with NBCUniversal, removing around 2/3rds of the network's homes (bringing it down to 8.5 million households), and NBCU already had been looking to remove extraneous networks without original programming since the summer of 2016, criteria which Cloo, Chiller, and Esquire fell into. In the end, however, industry media had little to no notice of the closure, and only cable providers learned of its demise in advance on January 31 as of 5:59 a.m. ET from Comcast, due to the small amount of time which passed between Charter's settlement of their new NBCUniversal carriage agreement and the network's closure. Because the network was effectively automated with little to no promotions to maintain, no employees were affected by the network's closure.

The same morning, its social media presences were removed, and the website redirected to the USA Network site without any notice. The network's last programming day consisted of a full-series marathon of Syfy's Continuum, a final sign of its later channel drift. Following the end credits, a slide was shown, with the Cloo logo and the words "GOOD NIGHT!" underneath, along with "Thank you for watching Cloo", the NBCUniversal logo, and the name of the satellite that provided Cloo's broadcast (AMC 10, Transponder 7) in between two NBC logos, along with the common NBC off-air audio test using the network's trademark chimes, after which the channel space, created by Trio in 1994, folded and ceased to exist. The end of Cloo was coincidental with another Comcast announcement that the female-focused Oxygen would be switched to a true crime focus the same day within the coming months.

Programming 

On September 17, 2011, Cloo premiered two original series, which were cancelled after their first seasons.

 Dateline on Cloo, featuring repurposed Dateline NBC episodes focused on true-crime stories.
 Killer Instinct, a 13-part true-crime series featuring criminal profiler Mark Safarik.

The channel originally featured crime and mystery programming from NBCUniversal's extensive library of feature films, classic television shows, reality series and documentaries. Programming initially included popular and cult television series such as Simon & Simon, Miami Vice, The A-Team, Dragnet (1967–70 version), Emergency!, Adam-12,, Knight Rider, The Equalizer, Homicide: Life on the Street, JAG, Profiler, Magnum, P.I., The Rockford Files, The Burning Zone and more recent canceled series such as EZ Streets, Karen Sisco, and Deadline, Conviction, and Medical Investigation. Much of this older programming eventually migrated to sister digital subchannel network Cozi TV.

As Sleuth, it also aired mystery and suspense films such as Scarface, The Jackal, Casino, Sneakers and Mercury Rising.

On February 25, 2007, the channel aired a fourteen-hour movie marathon entitled "Chiller On Sleuth" to promote the launch of Chiller, a sister horror and suspense programming that launched four days later on March 1; The movies that aired during this marathon are Wait Until Dark,  Psycho, I Saw What You Did (the 1988 version), and The Island. Also, before this, on February 23 and 24, 2007, a preview of Chiller aired on The 101 Network (which is at channel 101 on DirecTV).

In January 2009, all shows from the lineup were removed and replaced with mainly NBCUniversal-produced, USA Network original shows, Monk and In Plain Sight to its lineup, running marathons of each program's episodes. NCIS was added to the channel's lineup, as well as two Canadian series, Da Vinci's Inquest and Cold Squad, which were barter syndication series which were mainly prevalent on low-tier local television stations and digital subchannel networks such as RTN. The Law & Order franchise also joined the channel. It also aired another Canadian series, The Eleventh Hour. However, it was renamed Bury the Lead, to differentiate it from the since-canceled CBS series of the same name.

Besides the above-mentioned series and franchises, various other series aired from the NBCUniversal library with rights through USA Network aired on Cloo, along with Walker, Texas Ranger before its 2015 departure to Grit and INSP. In September 2014, the rights to COPS previously held by now-defunct sister network G4 moved over to Cloo until new episode partner  Spike (now Paramount Network) took all control of the cable syndication rights of COPS at the start of 2016.

See also 
Cozi TV, where much of the network's older programming has migrated to

References 

2006 establishments in the United States
2017 disestablishments in the United States
Television channels and stations established in 2006
Television channels and stations disestablished in 2017
Defunct television networks in the United States